Hiawatha Farm, also known as the Levi Green and Mary Montanye House, is a historic home and farm complex located at Owego in Tioga County, New York. The two story, five bay center entrance house was built about 1825 in the transitional Federal / Greek Revival style. Also on the property an English barn dating to the 1820s, garage, and chicken house.

It was listed on the National Register of Historic Places in 1998.

References

Houses on the National Register of Historic Places in New York (state)
Federal architecture in New York (state)
Houses in Tioga County, New York
National Register of Historic Places in Tioga County, New York